Harry Skinner (May 25, 1855 – May 19, 1929) was a U.S. Representative from North Carolina, and the brother of U.S. Representative Thomas Gregory Skinner.

Biography
Skinner was born in Perquimans County, North Carolina, near Hertford, on May 25, 1855. He was a member of a wealthy political family; his father, James C. Skinner, was a state senator and clerk of the county court, and his grandfather, also named Harry Skinner, had served in both houses of the North Carolina legislature.

He attended Hertford Academy and was graduated from the University of Kentucky College of Law at Lexington.
He was admitted to the bar in 1876 and commenced practice in Greenville, North Carolina.
He served on the town council in 1878 before joining Governor Jarvis' staff and serving as aide-de-camp (1879–1886). He chaired the Democratic executive committees of the First Congressional District (1880–1890) and of Pitt County (1880–1892). In 1891 and 1892 he was a member of the State house of representatives. He chaired the Populist executive committee of Pitt County (1892–1896), was a member of the State central committee (1892–1896) and a trustee of the University of North Carolina at Chapel Hill (1890–1896).

He married Lottie Montiero on June 5, 1878, and they had six children. He remarried to Ella Montiero on October 26, 1895, and they had one child.

Skinner was elected as a Populist to the Fifty-fourth and Fifty-fifth Congresses (March 4, 1895 – March 3, 1899), but in 1898 was unsuccessful in his bid for reelection to the Fifty-sixth Congress. He served as United States attorney for the eastern district of North Carolina (1902–1910), after which he resumed the practice of law in Greenville, where he died on May 19, 1929, and was interred in Cherry Hill Cemetery.

References

External links
 
 

|-

1855 births
1929 deaths
People from Hertford, North Carolina
North Carolina Democrats
North Carolina Populists
People's Party members of the United States House of Representatives from North Carolina
United States Attorneys for the Eastern District of North Carolina
Members of the United States House of Representatives from North Carolina
University of Kentucky College of Law alumni